Gibberula asellina is a species of sea snail, a marine gastropod mollusk, in the family Cystiscidae.

Description
The length of the shell attains 4.7 mm.

Distribution
This species occurs in the following locations:
 Mauritius
 Réunion

References

 Cossignani T. (2011) Una nuova Gibberula da Mauritius. Malacologia Mostra Mondiale 73: 13
  Boyer F. (2014). Révision des Gibberula (Gastropoda : Cystiscidae) du niveau récifal de l'archipel des Mascareignes. Xenophora Taxonomy. 5: 7-16.

External links
 Jousseaume F. (1875). Coquilles de la famille des marginelles. Monographie. Revue et Magazin de Zoologie. ser. 3, 3: 164-271; 429-435.

asellina
Gastropods described in 1875
Cystiscidae